This is the list of cathedrals and co-cathedrals in Slovakia sorted by denomination.

Catholic

Latin Rite
The following are Latin Rite cathedrals and co-cathedrals of the Catholic Church in Slovakia:

Eastern Rites
The following cathedrals of the Slovak Greek Catholic Church are located in Slovakia:

Eastern Orthodox
The following cathedrals of the Czech and Slovak Orthodox Church cathedrals are located in Slovakia:

See also
List of cathedrals

References

Cathedrals in Slovakia
Slovakia
Cathedrals
Cathedrals